Reidar Johansen (born 18 May 1955 in Hammerfest) is a Norwegian politician for the Socialist Left Party. He was elected to the Norwegian Parliament from Finnmark in 1989, and was re-elected on one occasion. Johansen was involved in local politics in Sørøysund and its successor municipality Hammerfest between 1983 and 1989.

References
 

1955 births
Living people
Socialist Left Party (Norway) politicians
People from Hammerfest
Members of the Storting
20th-century Norwegian politicians